Legend of the Fist: Chen Zhen is a television series based on the story of Chen Zhen, a fictional apprentice of the Chinese martial artist Huo Yuanjia. The series is a sequel to the 2008 television series Huo Yuanjia, with Jordan Chan reprising his role as Chen Zhen.

Plot 
The series is set in early 20th-century China. Chen Zhen, who was apparently killed after avenging Huo Yuanjia in Shanghai, has actually survived and moved to Beiping with Huo's orphaned son, Huo Dongjue. He has adopted a new identity and now works as a servant in a martial arts school run by the Fang family. Having dedicated himself to raising Huo Dongjue, he maintains a low profile to stay out of trouble and avoid being recognised. Meanwhile, he starts a romantic relationship with Fang Zhixin, one of the Fang siblings, and gets drawn into a rivalry between the Fang family and a Japanese dojo. Although he is reluctant to get involved in the conflict, he still helps the Fang family drive away the dojo's fighters on a few occasions while in disguise as a masked man dressed in black. His true identity is ultimately revealed and he is forced to go into hiding.

Initially, Chen Zhen only cares about raising Huo Dongjue and reviving the Jingwu School, Huo Yuanjia's legacy. However, over time, he begins to understand that he has a better purpose in life — to defend China from foreign intrusion, especially by the Japanese. He participates in missions to disrupt the Japanese's plans for invasion until the outbreak of the Second Sino-Japanese War. On the night before the Japanese invade Beiping, Chen Zhen rallies his allies to destroy the Japanese spy agency based in the dojo. He sacrifices himself in the battle and becomes a martyr.

Cast 
 Jordan Chan as Chen Zhen
 Dong Jie as Fang Zhixin
 Terence Yin as Yagyū Shizukumo (Liusheng Jingyun)
 Chu Yinan as Xu Yanru
 Liu Zihao as Fang Zhiwei
 Tang Yifei as Chiyo (Qiandai)
 Norman Chui as Satō Kashirakawa (Zuoteng Bachuan)
 Bryan Leung as Huangfu Yizhen
 Tony Liu as Xu Yannong
 Sun Yan as Fang Zhixiong
 Wang Feihong as Lu Da'an
 Liu Jiaoxin as Police Chief Jin
 Guo Shengran as Huo Dongjue
 Li Xiaoyan as Fang siblings' mother
 Alan Ng as Yamamoto Hiro (Shanben Hong)
 Jin Peng as Asami Sawa (Qianjian Ze)
 Fang Ye as Zhang He

References

External links 
  Legend of the Fist: Chen Zhen on Sina.com

2008 Hong Kong television series debuts
Martial arts television series
Television shows set in Beijing